Brickellia botterii is a Mexican species of flowering plants in the family Asteraceae. It is native to the state of Veracruz on the coast of the Gulf of Mexico.

The species is named for Italian ornithologist Matteo Botteri (1808 – 1877).

References

botterii
Flora of Veracruz
Plants described in 1917